The Happy Cricket is a 2001 Brazilian animated fantasy film directed by Walbercy Ribas. The film is about Christopher, a happy, singing, guitar-playing, and music-loving cricket who must rescue his friends from the evil and music-hating monitor lizard, King Wartlord, and save Linda the Night Star from that villain's grasp.

Plot

Production
The title character was first seen in local commercials for Sharp Electronics in the 1980s. The film spent over 20 years in development, and 30 months in production.

The English-language dub is dedicated to one of its voice actors, the late Bob Papenbrook.

Animation
The movie was produced by StartAnima in São Paulo, Brazil. It uses both traditional animation (2D animation) and computer animation (3D animation) with Adobe After Effects (compositing and visual effects), Alias Wavefront Maya (compositing, computer animation and modeling), pencil and paper (hand-drawn animation, rotoscoping and storyboards), oil-paint and paper (background art) and Sofimage Toonz (compositing, digital ink and paint, traditional animation and video editing) were created for using software from industries Adobe Inc., Digital Video, Microsoft and Silicon Graphics.

Sequel
In early 2009, 20th Century Fox released a CGI sequel, O Grilo Feliz e os Insetos Gigantes (The Happy Cricket and the Giant Bugs).

Cast

Original version

Vagner Fagundes - Grilo
Araken Saldanha - Maledeto
Régis Monteiro - Faz Tudo
Fátima Noya - Bituquinho
Letícia Quinto - Juliana
Nelson Machado - Sapo 1
Renato Master - Sapo 2
Antonio Moreno - Sapo 3
Camila Bullara - Pouco Grilo
Jorge Barcellos - Caracol velho / Geral
Emerson Caperbat - Pai
José Soares Maya - Tucano
Isaura Gomes - Saranha
Rita de Almeida - Caracolino
Marli Bortoletto - Bacaninha
Rodrigo Andreatto - Rafael
Ursula Bezerra - Moreninha
Tatiana de S. Parra - Linda Estrela Da Noite (singing voice)
José Luiz Burato - Grilo (singing voice)

English version
Sam Riegel - Christopher The Happy Cricket
Bob Papenbrook - Wartlord
Cindy Robinson - Honeydew / Spidora
Peter Doyle (actor) - Magic Toucan / Soldier 1
Bob Buchholz - Barnaby / Sergeant
Dave Mallow - Buffuno
Steve Staley - Leonardo
Neil Kaplan - Toad 1
Dan Woren - Toad 2
Grant George - Father / Toad 3
Stephanie Sheh - Little Christopher / Sneally
Steve Kramer - Old Snail / General
Mona Marshall - Cartibella
Philece Sampler - Isabella
Tatiana de S. Parra - Linda The Night Star (singing voice)

See also
Cinema of Brazil
List of animated feature-length films

References

External links

Official sites (Flash required)
 Official franchise site
 Official site of Clever Image Studios

Other

2001 animated films
2001 films
2000s adventure films
Animated musical films
Animated films about insects
Brazilian animated films
Brazilian children's films
Brazilian fantasy adventure films
2000s children's animated films
2000s Portuguese-language films